Malankara Catholic Youth Movement (മലങ്കര കത്തോലിക്കാ യുവജന പ്രസ്ഥാനം ) is an association of youngsters of the globally spread Syro Malankara Catholic Church, which focuses on the development of the Youths, Church and the society. MCYM is working at the Unit, Regional and Diocesan level & Church level.

History
 The Catholic Youth Movement of Kerala dates back to the second half of the 1960s. Although there were some youth organisations in the parish level at different parts of Kerala, the spread of the organization of the youth movements in the diocesan took place rather late. Two reasons seem to be of prime importance for the foundation of the youth organizations in the late 1960s. First of all, in the church there was a great enthusiasm both in the Kerala region and National level discussions and study programs of the Second Vatican Council. From different topics the role of laity in the life of Church has become one of the important points that attracted the laity all over India. Secondly, in Kerala the Christian communities along with other social and religious organizations started fighting against the second communist regime in 1967. In particular the fight was against the educational policy of the Government. The former has already given the ideological basis for the organization of the laity at various levels and the latter has given an immediate reason to join with the Church in its for justice.The visionary desire of Zacharias Mar Athanasios, the first organized youth organization in the Kerala Catholic Church was formed. It is in this background that the youth gathering at Vennikulam, on 17 November 1967 under Presidency of Msgr Mathew Nedungad the then Vicar General of Thiruvalla Diocese  decided to start a youth organization. Under the able leadership of Mr Varghese Karippayil an adhoc committee was formed and later on 28 February 1968 it was formally launched. Fr Chacko Elavumparampil was appointed as its first director. .To the great enthusiasm of the youth, the dean of the oriental congregation Cardinal Feuston Berg inaugurated the youth organization in which Zacharias Mar Athanasios presided .It was inaugurated at St.John's Cathedral, Thiruvalla on 28 February 1968. In the beginning the organization was known as Kerala Katholikka Yuvajana Sanghadana or Kearala Catholic Youth Organization(KCYO)..

The movement began in the Thiruvananthapuram Diocese in 1971, led by Rev Fr Dominic Skariah.
 
The youth movement in Thiruvananthapuram, Thiruvalla  and Bathery  were conducted independently. At the same time, it was forced to be united in the Kerala level because of the federal administrative style of Kerala Catholic Youth Movement (KCYM) . It was the federation of the youth movements of three independent churches. Hence for the election and for any decisions in the regional level it was important for the MCYM's of different Diocese to work together. But in the church level it became a reality only with the formation of a youth commission under Cyril Baselios, the then Bishop of Bathery Diocese  in 1989. Subsequently, the youth movement activities scattered in different diocese was brought together in 1990 leading to the formation of the MCYM Central Secretariat.
 
The MCYM in different dioceses had its own constitution, flag,  anthem, motto patron saint and style of function. In view of giving uniformity, the central secretariat  succeeded to agree on a common constitution  . It was promulgated in 1992 September 20. Central Secretariat initiate several steps within short span to reclaim the youth activities to reach up to its optimum and brought various mission regions scattered all over India, N America, Germany and Middle East (Kuwait, Dubai, Sharjah, Qatar, Bahrain)  together and also given equivalent status to Diocese under its new constitution and this bestowed a new boost to MCYM activities in these regions. Now MCYM Central Secretariat is all set to amend the constitution to include various demands and suggestion put forward by Dioceses and Extra Territorial Regions.

Goal

According to the By-laws of the Malankara Catholic Youth Movement, its mission is to continue the plan of salvation definitively begun by GOD the Father in His only begotten Son, Jesus Christ. The ultimate goal of this organization is to make this salvation historical plan available to humanity through the Malankara Catholic Church. Evangelization is the means to realize this. This organization aims at the total liberation of society and the integral development of Youth. For the realization of this goal, the by-laws go on to specify the general plan of action:

Spiritual

Help the youth to deepen their Christian faith and to apply principles of faith in their daily lives, give training to acquire through a life of prayer, a spiritual outlook and a style of leadership proper to Christian ideals, concertize them in Christian principles to practice an exemplary life-style, enable them to lead an exemplary sacramental life by developing appreciation of the liturgical life and practices of the church, give (them) practical training to take up leadership roles in catechesis, prayer-meetings, retreats and Bible conventions with a view to revitalize the parish community.

Intellectual
Give encouragement and make facilities available for members to acquire scientific and technical knowledge and to learn appreciate and propagate the doctrines of the Church; conduct discussions, seminars, debates, corner meetings, exhibitions, excursions etc.; organize study circles, libraries etc. to make available educational and religious publications.

Social
Prepare the Youth to analytically study the actual state of society, to react boldly against social evil and to work for the creation of a new society through positive action based on Christian ideals; Encourage new initiatives in the fields of labor, agricultural and industry by providing training in them; seek the solutions for social problems through organized activities; Collect and disseminate information on the welfare schemes of the government and of the Church and endeavor to make these available to the deserving, plan action programs for the progress of the backward communities and of groups subjected to injustice, neglect, and disabilities.

Cultural

Set the state to defend and promote Christian and Indian Cultural traditions; create opportunities to appreciate Indian intellectual heritage (Systems of Philosophy), organize youth festivals, literary-cultural training camps and competitions, cultural gatherings etc. to discover and to develop the literary and athletic abilities of the Youth.

Politics

The youth is entrusted with the responsibility of actively participating in politics that is the cradle of democracy. MCYM exhorts and encourages its members to engage in politics and lead the people to get involved in it.

MCYM Anthem

Constitution of MCYM

Different stages of growth 
MCYM works in parish units, in regional or ecclesiastical districts, in mission centres, in eparchies or archieparhies, in the Church as a whole (unit/regional/ecclesiastical district/mission centres/diocese/archdiocese/church levels).

The following is a brief description of the permanent action-plan of the central body, developed during the past fifteen years. It organizes six major activities in a year.

Global Meet & Youth conventions 
National Meet, Annual Senate, Directors’ Meet are organized in the month of May from 2004 onwards and now it is conducted as global meet.

Along with the Re-union celebrations, the youth convention is being conducted in September and it commences with the Flaming Light Procession, and Flag Procession. The youth conventions are conducted under the leadership of the central body and each eparchial unit.

Commemoration of Ivanios 
On the day before the commemoration of the late Archbishop Geevarghese Ivanios, the founder of Malankara Re-union Movement, the MCYM conducts memorial meetings at the tomb of Ivanios.

MCYM Day - October 
The Sunday close to the Feast of St. Francis Assisi is celebrated as the MCYM Day in the units. In 2017, it will be celebrated at Bthery 8 October Sunday. HESED 2K17

Study circle on St. Francis Assisi 
A seminar is being held every year on the life and visions of St. Francis Assisi, the heavenly patron of MCYM, is and it is conducted in the eparchy where the youth convention is held.

Malankara Youth Convention Outside Kerala 
This convention is organized for the youth of the mission centres outside Kerala during the months of October and December and the members of the central secretariat actively participate in it.

Eparchial camps 
Central unit conducts three days camps for each diocese basing on the theme of the central unit and leadership training programs.

Amendment of constitution 
Timely amendment in the constitution of the Central Body has been made on 14 May 2005, and it was published by Cyril Baselios, the first Major Archbishop of Malankara Catholic Church.

Yuvachetana 
'Yuvachetana’, The official organ of the MCYM is being published every year by the central unit and at the time its 15th anniversary in 2006, a special issue was published as Souvenir.

Flag procession 
In connection with the elevation of Malankara Catholic Church as a Major Archiepiscopal Church MCYM and MCA jointly organized the Catholicos Flag Procession in two phases from 29 March to 13 May 2005. Mr. Thomas John Thevarath, the president of the MCA and V.C. Georgekutty, the president of the MCYM were the captains. It started from the diocese of Bathery and ended in the Archdiocese of Thiruvananthapuram. Most of the priests and diocesan leaders actively participated in it.

Youth Cross Procession 
As part of golden jubilee celebration, Youth cross procession conducted all over the church. It started from Delhi and Marthandom and ended at Punnamood, Mavelikkara, the golden jubilee celebration concluding venue. At the same time procession was conducted at Gulf regions, Europe and USA & Canada. It was led by President Tinu Kuriakose and General secretary San Baby.

Golden Jubilee Celebrations 2018 
Church level MCYM Golden jubilee celebrations was officially inaugurated by Bava Thirumeni by launching the Jubilee emblem at Mylapra, 26 January 2018. The entire unit level inauguration was at 19 March 2018 by hoisting MCYM flag at all units and Bava Thirumeni hoisted MCYM flag at Pattom cathedral.
MCYM golden jubilee celebrations concluded at Punnamood, Mavelikkara, 2019 January 19.

Malankara Youth Conventions outside KERALA
The Malankara Catholic Youth Movement of North America is the youth wing of Malankara Catholics in North America, specifically the Exarch of United States of America and the faithful in Canada. The Youth Movement has grew with the help of many including all the bishops, priests, and youth that have sacrificed for the sake of our youth.

References

External links 
 MCYM Central secretariat
 Syro-Malankara

Syro-Malankara Catholic dioceses
Syro-Malankara Catholic Church
Christian organizations established in 1967
Catholic youth organizations
Catholic organizations established in the 20th century
Youth organisations based in India